Classified is a 1925 American silent drama film directed by Alfred Santell and produced by and starring Corinne Griffith. It was based on a novel by Edna Ferber and distributed through First National Pictures.

The film was remade as Hard to Get by First National (subsidiary by Warner Brothers) in 1929 as an early talkie for Dorothy Mackaill, a Corinne Griffith rival at First National.

Plot
As described in a film magazine review, a telephone operator in the classified advertisement department of a metropolitan daily newspaper longs to get away from her drab surroundings and onto Fifth Avenue. She accepts many invitations from men to ride down the avenue with them in their cars, but up to the time she meets one rich young man is successful in evading their advances. Then she meets a handsome chap who drives a flivver, and, despite its poor condition, is interested in him nevertheless. One night after a motor trip into the country that does not end well, she decides that it is the man of the flivver she wants.

Cast

Preservation
A print of Classified has been preserved at the Library of Congress and the Wisconsin Center for Film and Theater Research.

References

External links

Stills and poster at silenthollywood.com

1925 films
American silent feature films
Films based on American novels
Films directed by Alfred Santell
First National Pictures films
1925 drama films
American black-and-white films
Silent American drama films
Films based on works by Edna Ferber
Surviving American silent films
1920s American films